Leutze is the surname of the following notable people:

 Emanuel Leutze (1816–1868), painter of American Revolutionary War scenes
 Eugene H. C. Leutze (1847–1931), admiral of the United States Navy
 USS Leutze (DD-481), a United States Navy destroyer named in honor of the admiral